The Bob Michel Bridge (formerly called Franklin Street Bridge) carries Illinois Route 40 over the Illinois River 0.75 miles (1.21 km) up-river from the Cedar Street Bridge.  Illinois 40 terminates at an interchange with Interstate 74 just east of the bridge.  The bridge serves as a direct surface route from a major commercial center in East Peoria to the Civic Center in downtown Peoria. When completed in 1993, the Bob Michel Bridge replaced the antiquated Franklin Street Bridge, a bascule and truss bridge, which had been located on an adjacent site since 1913.
The Bob Michel Bridge is the only river crossing in the Peoria area to accommodate pedestrians and cyclists.

Prior to the development of the area as a commercial center, the Michel Bridge served a largely industrial area in East Peoria, including many buildings owned by nearby Caterpillar, Inc. The bridge was located at the end of an exit named "Industrial Spur". It has since been renamed to "Riverfront Drive" to account for the new commercial complex.

The Bob Michel Bridge is named after former Congressman Robert H. Michel, a Peoria-area Republican who served as a Congressman from 1957 to 1995 and as House Minority Leader from 1981 until his retirement.

The bridge is located at mile 162.3 of the Illinois River.

References 

Bridges over the Illinois River
Bridges completed in 1993
Buildings and structures in Peoria, Illinois
East Peoria, Illinois
Bridges in Tazewell County, Illinois
Steel bridges in the United States
Girder bridges in the United States
Road bridges in Illinois
Bridges in Peoria County, Illinois
1993 establishments in Illinois